Capture NX is a photo editing computer program developed by Nik Software in partnership with Nikon for macOS and Microsoft Windows.

In September 2012, Google acquired Nik Software, but Capture NX has remained a Nikon software and is advertised as a Nikon product.

In July 2014, Nikon released a new software Capture NX-D to replace Capture NX 2. As such, Nikon D810 is the first camera to support only Capture NX-D. Capture NX-D was developed based on SILKYPIX Developer Studio and does not contain the U-Point technology from Nik Software.
Since February 2020, the current release of the software does not install on Windows 7 anymore.

On June 6, 2022, Nikon announced that Capture NX 2 and Capture NX-D will be discontinued and replaced by NX Studio. Download links for both programs were removed on June 30, 2022.

Features of both Capture NX products
Complete raw image format support from import to export (for supported cameras), including Nikon's own RAW format NEF (Nikon Electronic File).
Non-destructive image editing.
Color management control with Soft Proofing.
Color Aberration Control, D-Lighting (High Speed/High Quality), Image Dust Off, Vignette Control and Fisheye-to-Rectilinear Image Transformation.
Noise Reduction: global or selective adjustments.
Color Balance, Contrast/Brightness, Saturation/Warmth.
Lens correction tools, such as chromatic aberration or distortion control.
Auto Retouch Brush, to remove blemishes and dust from images. (not in Capture NX-D V 1.0 but will be added later)
Shadow/Highlight Adjustment, to open up shadows or recover blown out highlights.
Improved Edit List, to apply common editings like auto color aberration, auto red-eye correction, vignette control, tone curves, contrast and highlight, exposure compensation and shadow protection.
Filters, Ratings and Sorting Toolbar.

Features of Capture NX-D only
All changes are saved to a Sidecar File in subfolder NKS_PARAM.
At this moment relatively low performance (for versions 1.0x - 1.3x) comparing to latest versions of Capture NX 2.4x

Features of Capture NX only
All changes are saved to the NEF file.
Color Control Point editing for hue, brightness and saturation.
Selection Control Points, selectively edit photographs without the need to manually outline or mask the area for editing. 
Plug-In Interface for Nik Color Efex Pro
Ability to use Dust Off Reference photo created by some Nikon DSLR's to automatically remove dust from images

See also
Adobe Photoshop Lightroom
Aperture (software)
iPhoto

External links
Capture NX website
Nik Software website
Nikon Corporation website

References

Photo software